D. Jackson Coleman is a Professor of Clinical Ophthalmology at New York-Presbyterian Hospital at The Edward S. Harkness Eye Institute of Columbia University. He is the former John Milton McLean Professor of Ophthalmology and Chairman Emeritus at Weill Cornell Medical Center where he served as Chairman from 1979–2006. His specialties are retinal diseases and ultrasound, working with patients at Columbia University Medical Center.  Coleman is also engaged in research involving ultrasound, which he has pursued throughout his career with colleague Ronald Silverman in the Department of Ophthalmology at the Columbia University Medical Center.

Career

Coleman received his undergraduate degree from Union College and his medical degree from the University at Buffalo School of Medicine.  Following his internship at the Columbia Medical Division at Bellevue Hospital, he served with the U.S. Public Health Service in Washington, DC. He completed his residency in Ophthalmology at the Edward S. Harkness Eye Institute of Columbia Presbyterian as a National Institutes of Health Special Fellow.

He remained on the staff at Columbia Presbyterian Medical Center until 1979, when he was appointed Chairman and Chief of the Ophthalmology Department at The New York Hospital and John Milton McLean Professor of Ophthalmology at Cornell University Medical College.  He served as President of the Medical Board from 1991–1992, and again from 1994–1997. He has also served as Surgical Director of Manhattan Eye, Ear and Throat Hospital (MEETH), Senior Research Physician at Riverside Research Institute in New York City and consultant at Memorial Sloan-Kettering Cancer Center.  He has since returned to his roots, and is currently Professor of Ophthalmology at the Harkness Eye Institute of Columbia University Medical Center.

Research

His interest in physics led him to develop new ultrasound technologies for examining and treating the eye.  Together with William Konig and Louis Katz, he created the first commercially available B-scan ultrasound equipment.  His numerous patents include those for an ultrasonically vibrated surgical knife, an ultrasonic diagnostic and therapeutic transducer assembly (with methodology), a system of therapeutic ultrasound and real-time ultrasonic scanning, and an ultrasound system for corneal biometry. His pioneering surgical techniques include the first vitreo-retinal surgery in New York and, using the ultrasound that he developed, demonstrating that operating at an earlier stage in ocular trauma could vastly improve the patient's prognosis for recovery. He has specialized in vitreo-retinal surgery and has had a career-long interest in imaging research. With a generous gift from Charles and Margaret Dyson, He established the Margaret M. Dyson Vision Research Institute, one of the major retinal research programs in the world.  The Dyson Institute continues research on the causes and possible therapies for age related macular degeneration and ultrasound imaging of the retina and choroid.

Offices and awards

Coleman has been an officer of every major ultrasound medical society throughout the world, including the American Institute of Ultrasound in Medicine, the Societas Internationalis de Diagnostica Ultrasonica en Ophthalmologia and the World Federation for Ultrasound in Medicine and Biology, Inc.  He is past President of the American Retina Society and past President of the Club Jules Gonin of the International Retina Society. Coleman has authored over 200 peer-reviewed papers as well as numerous chapters in ophthalmology textbooks and has recently published the second edition of his textbook, Ultrasonography of the Eye and Orbit.

For his research he has received many awards including the Mildred Weisenfeld Award for Excellence in Ophthalmology from the Association for Research in Vision and Ophthalmology, the Herman Wacker Award of Club Jules Gonin, the Award of Merit in Retinal Research from the Retina Society, the Kreissig Award from the Euretina Congress, and an honorary degree from the University of Ferrara in Ferrara, Italy.  Additionally, Coleman was the 2001 recipient of the Maurice R. Greenberg Distinguished Service Award, the highest honor bestowed by New York-Presbyterian Hospital/Weill Cornell Medical Center on a member of its professional staff. He has been made a Fellow of the Association for Research in Vision and Ophthalmology.

Recent publications

Books

 Coleman DJ, Silverman RH, Lizzi FL, Reinstein DZ, Rondeau MJ, Lloyd HO, Daly SW. "Ultrasonography of the Eye and Orbit." 2nd Edition. Lippincott Williams & Wilkins, Philadelphia, 2006.

Peer reviewed

References 

American ophthalmologists
Cornell University faculty
Living people
Year of birth missing (living people)
University at Buffalo alumni